Ziebell is a surname. Notable people with the surname include:

Jack Ziebell (born 1991), Australian rules footballer
Keith Ziebell (born 1942), Australian cricketer